Coniothyrium henriquesii is a fungal plant pathogen.

References

External links

Fungal plant pathogens and diseases
Pleosporales